Bebey is the third studio album by American rapper Theophilus London. The album features guest appearances from Kristian Hamilton, Tame Impala, Gemaine, Lil Yachty, Ian Isiah, Raekwon, Giggs and Ariel Pink; it was self-released on January 17, 2020.

Track listing

References

2020 albums
Theophilus London albums
Albums produced by Kevin Parker